The 2022 Nebraska's 1st congressional district special election was held on June 28, 2022. The seat became vacant upon the resignation of incumbent Republican representative Jeff Fortenberry on March 31, who had announced his plans to resign after being indicted and arrested for lying to the FBI about campaign contributions.

Under Nebraska state law, major party nominees for special elections are selected by the party through its executive committee or party convention, with the special election scheduled by Governor Pete Ricketts within 90 days after the seat's vacancy.

The election came under some controversy over the discovery that it would be held in the new post-2020 redistricting Nebraska's 1st congressional district. While some Nebraska officials claimed that the new map took immediate effect when signed, this was not in line with congressional rules which only recognized pre-2020 redistricting boundaries for the rest of 2022. It also caused confusion among Nebraska residents wanting to vote in the election or receive constituent services, especially as congressional funds are not allowed to be spent outside the recognized old district boundaries.

Against a backdrop of the Dobbs v. Jackson Women's Health Organization ruling four days before the election which overturned the landmark Roe v. Wade case on abortion, Republican nominee Mike Flood promoted his sponsorship of a 2010 Nebraska state law which banned abortions 20 weeks after fertilization in a campaign ad. Meanwhile, Democrat Patty Pansing Brooks highlighted her support for abortion rights, criticizing the Dobbs decision as an "assault on privacy" and "a step backward in American culture", and remarked that the election was the first instance where "we can fight back at the ballot box".

After a campaign described by the Norfolk Daily News as "mostly positive" with "lighthearted" ads, Flood declared victory at 10:23 pm CDT, two hours after polls closed, promising to fight inflation, for which he blamed the policies of the Biden administration. 

In light of the competitiveness of the election, (early results had shown Flood trailing Pansing Brooks) Nebraska Democratic Party chair Jane Kleeb released a statement that the national Democratic Party needed to invest more in rural areas considered to be "unwinnable" and that Pansing Brooks "connected with voters".

Both candidates faced each other again in the November regular election.

Candidates
The Democratic and Republican nominees were selected by their respective party's executive committee on April 5 and April 9, respectively. Mike Flood defeated John Glen Weaver through the party's secret ballot 24 to Weaver's 5 votes.

Nominees 
 Mike Flood (Republican), state senator (20052013, 20212022), former speaker of the Nebraska Legislature (20072013), and candidate for governor in 2014
 Patty Pansing Brooks (Democratic), state senator

General election

Endorsements

Predictions

Fundraising

Results
Pansing Brooks' vote share was boosted by a higher-than-expected turnout in Lancaster County, home to state capital Lincoln, where she serves as state senator, with the second-highest turnout of all counties. She also came within a five-point margin of winning the suburban Omaha county of Sarpy. Meanwhile, Flood's victory was the result of him winning more rural counties in the district. Pansing Brooks's outperformance of Biden in the district, in spite of being outspent by Flood, prompted some Democratic strategists to paint the results as a moral victory in a "post-Roe" era. In reaction to the results, Flood acknowledged the need for him to increase his support in the Lincoln area and suburban Omaha.

See also
2022 United States House of Representatives elections
2022 United States elections
117th United States Congress
List of special elections to the United States House of Representatives

References 

Nebraska 01 special
United States House of Representatives 01 special
United States House of Representatives 2022 01
Nebraska 2022 01
Nebraska 2022 01
2022 01 special